The Tanzilla Plateau is a plateau in the Stikine Country of the Northern Interior of British Columbia, Canada.  It is a sub-plateau of the Stikine Plateau and is located east of the Tuya River, north of the Stikine River and surrounding Dease Lake; its eastern extremity verges on the Stikine Ranges of the Cassiar Mountains at Dark Mountain and Pyramid Mountain.  The Spatsizi Plateau is to the southeast, the Klastline Plateau to the south, the Tahltan Highland to the west and southwest, and the Kawdy Plateau to the west and northwest.  All are also sub-plateaus of the Stikine Plateau.

Subranges
French Range
Hotailuh Range

See also
Tuya Volcanic Field
Volcanism of Canada
Volcanism of Western Canada

References

Plateaus of British Columbia
Stikine Country
Stikine Plateau
Volcanism of British Columbia